The Victoria Social Association (HKVSA) was a local political group based in Central and Western District and Wan Chai District, the former area of the Victoria City founded in April 2016. The association won one seat in Wan Chai in 2019 District Council election.

History 
The association was founded in April 2016 by Chow Sai-kit, who was a former member of the pro-independence Youngspiration. Chow ran in the 2015 District Council election in Kennedy Town & Mount Davis but failed to win a seat. In the 2019 District Council election, four members of the association ran in the election, while only two of them ran under the banner of VSA. Chow himself ran as a substitute candidate for independent Fergus Leung Fong-wai in case Leung was disqualified from running in Kwun Lung. While Fung was elected, Li Wing-choi who represented the association won a seat in Victoria Park, as well as two members who ran as independents, Pang Ka-ho and Ho Chi-wang won in Sai Wan and Water Street respectively.

Beijing mouthpiece Wen Wei Po accused the VSA of being pro-independence, citing chairman Chow Sai-kit former membership of Youngspiration and Li Wing-choi's opposition to the proposed National Anthem Bill. The association refuted by claiming that the news report was fabricated and reserved the right to sue.

Election results

District Council elections

References

External links 
 

Political parties in Hong Kong
Political parties established in 2016
2016 establishments in Hong Kong
Political parties disestablished in 2020
2020 disestablishments in Hong Kong
Liberal parties in Hong Kong
Localist parties in Hong Kong